A state of emergency is where a government enacts extraordinary policies for the safety of their citizens.

State of emergency may also refer to:

Films
 State of Emergency (1994 film), an American drama
 State of Emergency (2004 film), a Nigerian action movie
 State of Emergency (2011 film), an American horror film

Music
 State of Emergency (Dalmatian EP), 2012
 State of Emergency (Steel Pulse album), 1988
 State of Emergency (The Living End album), 2006
 State of Emergency (Lil Tjay EP), 2020
 Bill Cosby Presents the Cosnarati: State of Emergency, an album by Bill Cosby, 2009
 The Product III: State of Emergency, an album by August Alsina, 2020
 "State of Emergency", a song by Logic from the 2018 album Bobby Tarantino II
 "Jóga", a 1997 song by Björk, containing the repeated lyric "State of emergency"

Other uses
 State of Emergency (book), by Patrick Buchanan, 2006
 State of Emergency (video game), 2002 
 Death Before Dishonor X: State of Emergency, a 2012 professional wrestling internet pay-per-view event

See also

 Emergency (disambiguation)
 Snow emergency, the active response plan to a snow storm